Sanjeeva Ranatunga (born 25 April 1969) is a former Sri Lankan cricketer who played in 9 Test matches and 13 One Day Internationals from 1994 to 1997.

Family
He is the brother of former Sri Lanka captain Arjuna Ranatunga, Dammika Ranatunga, Nishantha Ranatunga and Prasanna Ranatunga.

International career
He has scored 2 centuries in Tests; 118 and 100* against Zimbabwe in consecutive Tests at Harare Sports Club and Queens Sports Club in 1994. His other notable performances are a hard-fought 60 and 65 against Australia at Adelaide in 1996. His highest ODI score of 70 came against Pakistan at R. Premadasa Stadium, Colombo in 1994 which earned him the Man of the Match Award.

References

1969 births
Living people
Sri Lanka Test cricketers
Sri Lanka One Day International cricketers
Sri Lankan cricketers
Basnahira North cricketers
Basnahira South cricketers
Sinhalese Sports Club cricketers
Kandurata cricketers